The 22129 / 30 Lokmanya Tilak Terminus–Allahabad Tulsi Express is an Express train belonging to Indian Railways – Central Railway zone that runs between Lokmanya Tilak Terminus &  in India. It is the only train that runs from Mumbai to Allahabad via Jhansi.

It operates as train number 22129 from Lokmanya Tilak Terminus to Allahabad Junction and as train number 22130 in the reverse direction, serving the states of Maharashtra, Madhya Pradesh & Uttar Pradesh.

Coaches
The 22129 / 30 Lokmanya Tilak Terminus–Allahabad Tulsi Express has 1 AC 2 tier, 3 AC 3 tier, 12 Sleeper Class, 4 General Unreserved & 2 SLR (Seating cum Luggage Rake) coaches. It does not carry a pantry car.

As is customary with most train services in India, coach composition may be amended at the discretion of Indian Railways depending on demand.

Service

As the average speed of the train is below , as per Indian Railways rules, its fare does not include a Superfast surcharge.

Routeing

Traction

The route is fully electrified. Earlier a Kalyan-based WCAM-3 locomotive would haul the train from Lokmanya Tilak Terminus until  handing over to an Itarsi-based WAP-4 or WAM-4 until  following which a Jhansi-based WDM-3A locomotive would haul the train for the remainder of the journey until Allahabad Junction.

With Central Railways progressively moving towards a complete changeover from DC to AC traction, it is now hauled by a Bhusawal or Itarsi-based WAP-4 locomotive for the remainder of the journey until Allahabad Junction.

Operation

22129 Lokmanya Tilak Terminus–Allahabad Tulsi Express leaves Lokmanya Tilak Terminus every Tuesday and Sunday reaching Allahabad Junction the next day.

22130 Allahabad–Lokmanya Tilak Terminus Tulsi Express leaves Allahabad Junction every Monday and Wednesday reaching Lokmanya Tilak Terminus the next day.

Incidents

On 3 October 2007, a fire damaged the sleeper class coach of the train during shunting operations. As the train was empty at the time, no injuries were reported

See also

 Allahabad Duronto Express
 Saket Express
 Godaan Express
 Chhapra Express
 Bhopal–Pratapgarh Express (via Lucknow)

References

External links

Transport in Mumbai
Trains from Allahabad
Express trains in India
Rail transport in Maharashtra
Rail transport in Madhya Pradesh
Named passenger trains of India